Raven Moon Entertainment, Inc was founded by CEO Joey DiFrancesco in 1998 and the company was based in Longwood, Florida, later moving to Orlando, Florida. Registered on the NASDAQ under (RVMN), the company produced family-oriented children television movies and videos, DVDs, CDs; the company had 44 television shows and DVDs such as Gina D Kids Club. Raven Moon Entertainment, Inc had major distribution contracts with Pro-Active Entertainment Group a distribution company located in Rancho Mirage and with Radio Disney in New York, Chicago, Los Angeles, Tampa Bay and Orlando. Radio. In 2005 James H. Rosenfield, former president of the CBS Television Network agreed to serve on Raven Moon Entertainment Inc.'s board of advisers. Raven Moon Entertainment Inc. also had major contracts with legendary songwriters Artie Singer and Roy Strigis songwriters and Executive Producers Joey and Bernadette DiFrancesco on children's songs for "Gina D's Kids Club" programs. 
Raven Moon had many subsidiaries which included Made In America Entertainment JB Toys LLC, Raven Animation, Inc In addition to Gina Ds Kids Club. The Company has produced a Mr. Bicycle Man and a Let's Get Fit Public Service Announcement. the company produced a 90-minute feature length made for television movieand DVD called Gina D’S Pre-School Musical The Movie. Later in the company's history they got involved producing a line of swimsuits for mature women targeted at women ages of 42 and 60 in the United States. Raven Moon Entertainment changed its name to Made in America Entertainment Inc (MAEIE), which was effective August 29, 2008.
Raven Moon holds the record for diluted stock within Wall Street's history, taking advantage of the loose laws in Florida to reap massive financial gains for its principal shareholder, Joey DiFrancesco, at the expense of those who were duped into buying its stock.

References

 https://www.bloomberg.com/apps/news?pid=newsarchive&sid=aZ7jNryHD.hg
 http://finance.boston.com/boston/news/read?GUID=2580433
 https://archive.today/20130819181116/http://finance.optimum.net/optonline/news/read?GUID=5110568
 http://markets.financialcontent.com/stocks/news/read/1911090/Raven_Moon_Breaking_News_
 https://www.animationmagazine.net/tv/raven-moon-opens-toon-division/
 http://www.bizjournals.com/profiles/company/us/fl/heathrow/raven_moon_entertainment_inc/844407

External links
 http://www.prnewswire.com/news-releases/raven-moon-entertainment-inc-receives-4000000-letter-of-intent-77586427.html
 http://www.prnewswire.com/news-releases/raven-moon-entertainment-receives-initial-purchase-order-from-pro-active-entertainment-group-inc-for-distribution-of-gina-ds-kids-club-product-line-to-major-video-retailers-74660997.html
 http://www.prnewswire.com/news-releases/raven-moon-entertainment-signs-sales-and-distribution-agreement-with-pro-active-entertainment-group-inc-76283637.html
 http://finance.paidcontent.org/paidcontent/news/read?Symbol=130%3A2625746&GUID=172172

Film distributors of the United States
Companies based in Florida
Music companies of the United States
Longwood, Florida